The 34th Japan Record Awards were held on December 31, 1992, and were broadcast live on TBS.

Award winners

Pops and Rock
Japan Record Award:
Kome Kome Club for "Kimi ga Iru Dake de"
Best Vocalist:
Seiko Matsuda
Best New Artist:
Masatoshi Ono
Best Album:
Southern All Stars for "世に万葉の花が咲くなり"
Best Foreign Artist:
Bobby Caldwell

Enka and Kayōkyoku
Japan Record Award:
Miyako Otsuki for "白い海峡"
Best Vocalist:
Yutaka Yamakawa
Best New Artist:
Miyuki Nagai
Best Album:
Fuyumi Sakamoto for "男惚れ"

External links
Official Website

Japan Record Awards
Japan Record Awards
Japan Record Awards
Japan Record Awards
1992